Paul Greenberg is a Canadian-American voice actor. He is also known as Aaron Albertus, Paul A. Greenberg, Paul Ari Greenberg, and Pierre Holloway.

Filmography

Television
 All Grown Up! - Racine (Ep. "O Bro, Where Are Thou?")
 As Told by Ginger - Naked Mole Rat Expert (Ep. "Family Therapy")
 Back at the Barnyard - Additional voices
 Buffy the Vampire Slayer - Shempy Vamp (Ep. "Bargaining" Pt. 1 and Pt. 2)
 Curb Your Enthusiasm - Dinner Guest (Ep. "Porno Gil")
 Invader Zim - Poonchy, Iggins, Additional voices
 Reno 911! - Scott Greenberg
 Stark Raving Mad - Yuppie (Ep. "The Stalker")
 The Adventures of Jimmy Neutron: Boy Genius - Brobot, Ooblar
 The Jenny McCarthy Show - Various
 The Jungle Book - Daruka, Phaona
 The Mr. Men Show - Mr. Bump, Mr. Quiet
 The Vacant Lot - Various characters 
 The Wacky Adventures of Ronald McDonald - Fry Kid #2
 The Wild Thornberrys - Barno (Ep. "Bad Company")
 Yo-kai Watch - Barnaby "Bear" Bernstein, Manjimutt, Mr. Johnson, Brokenbrella, Cricky, Coughkoff, D'wanna, Dandoodle, Duchoo, Elder Bloom, Fidgephant, Happierre, Hungramps, Peckpocket, Steve Jaws, Tengloom, Yoodooit, Additional voices

Film
 As Good as It Gets - Bar Waiter
 Jimmy Neutron: Boy Genius - Yolkian Guard
 The Ant Bully - Sleeping Ant #1, Head Lice, Brett
 Tommy Boy - Skittish Student
 Yo-kai Watch: The Movie - Barnaby "Bear" Bernstein, Bronzlow, Dandoodle, Fishmonger, Happierre, Manjimutt, Man #1, The Wicked, Wicked Man #2

Video games
 Crash Nitro Kart - Geary, Pura
 EverQuest II - Generic Human Enemy
 Yo-Kai Watch - Various Yo Kai

External links
 

American male voice actors
Canadian male voice actors
Living people
20th-century American male actors
21st-century American male actors
20th-century Canadian male actors
21st-century Canadian male actors
Year of birth missing (living people)